Geoffrey Anthony Collins (10 August 1926 – 14 August 2005) was an Australian rules football player in the Victorian Football League (VFL).

Geoff Collins played in the Melbourne premiership team of 1948, and again in the losing 1954 Grand Final side.

War service
Collins served in the Korean War as a fighter pilot, flying Gloster Meteor jets with 77 Squadron RAAF between 1 January and 14 August 1953.

Notes

References
Main, J. & Allen, D., Fallen — The Ultimate Heroes: Footballers Who Never Returned From War, Crown Content, (Melbourne), 2002.

External links

Korean War Nominal Roll Service Record

1926 births
2005 deaths
Melbourne Football Club players
Australian military personnel of the Korean War
Royal Australian Air Force officers
Melbourne Football Club captains
Australian rules footballers from Melbourne
Melbourne Football Club Premiership players
One-time VFL/AFL Premiership players
People from Kew, Victoria
Military personnel from Melbourne